This list of fossil molluscs described in 2021 is a list of new taxa of fossil molluscs that were described during the year 2021, as well as other significant discoveries and events related to molluscan paleontology that occurred in 2021.

Ammonites

New taxa

Research
 A modern review of the palaeobiology of heteromorph ammonoids is published by Hoffmann et al. (2021), including details of their anatomy, buoyancy, locomotion, predators, diet, palaeoecology, and extinction.
 A study on the impact of the Permian–Triassic extinction event on the morphological diversity of ammonites is published by Dai, Korn & Song (2021).
 A study on the morphology and ontogeny of whorl profiles of the late Anisian ceratitid ammonites is published by Bischof et al. (2021).
 An exceptionally preserved specimen of Sigaloceras enodatum, providing information on the anatomy of ammonite muscles, is described from the Middle Jurassic (Callovian) Kellaways Sand Member of Colne Gravel (Gloucestershire, United Kingdom) by Cherns et al. (2021), who evaluate the implications of this specimen for the knowledge of the swimming mechanism of ammonites.
 Soft parts of a perisphinctid belonging to the genus Subplanites, separated from the conch either taphonomically or during a failed predation, are described from the Tithonian conservation deposits of Wintershof (southern Germany) by Klug et al. (2021).
 The first physical compression experiments on model ammonite septa are performed by Johnson et al. (2021), who attempt to determine whether the increasingly complex fractal margins of ammonite septa might have evolved to increase resistance to shell-crushing predators.
 A study aiming to determine the function of complex septa in the ammonite shell, providing evidence of a relationship between septal complexity and capacity for liquid retention within chambers of the shell, likely improving buoyancy regulation, is published by Peterman et al. (2021).
 Two specimens of Peltoceras athleta having both female and male features are described from Callovian limestone beds in Méron near Montreuil-Bellay (France) by Frau & Boursicot (2021), who interpret these specimens as cases of intersexuality in ammonites.
 Soft tissue remains preserved within the conch of a specimen of Proleymeriella schrammeni from the Albian of Germany are described by Hoffmann et al. (2021).
 A study on the arrangement in space and probable nature of hook-like structures found with specimens of Rhaeboceras halli is published by Smith et al. (2021), who interpret these structures as representing part of the brachial crown armature, and propose a hypothetical reconstruction of an ammonite brachial crown.
 A study on the systematics and phylogeny of the genus Aegocrioceras is published by Weinkauf, Hoffmann & Wiedenroth (2021).
 A study on the hydrostatic properties of Baculites compressus, and on their implications for the knowledge of the swimming capabilities and ecology of this ammonite and orthoconic cephalopods in general, is published by Peterman & Ritterbush (2021).
 Revision of the fossil material of Parapuzosia seppenradensis, including historic specimens from Europe and the United States and new material from England and Mexico, and a study on the ontogeny, distribution and evolution of this ammonite, is published by Ifrim et al. (2021).
 A study on the habitat depth preferences of Hoploscaphites constrictus from the European Boreal Chalk Sea, as indicated by stable isotope thermometry of aptychi and by data from predation marks on the scaphitid moulds, is published by Machalski et al. (2021).
 A study on the relationship between sutural complexity and body size in Cretaceous ammonites is published by Pérez-Claros (2021).

Other cephalopods

New taxa

Research
 New fossil material with shell features that characterize early cephalopods is described from the Cambrian (Terreneuvian) Bonavista Formation (Canada) by Hildenbrand et al. (2021), who interpret this finding as possibly representing the earliest cephalopods known to date, potentially pushing the origin of cephalopods back in time by about 30 million years, to the time before the first occurrence of euarthropods.
 Two specimens of Syrionautilus libanoticus preserving soft parts, including a specimen showing an imprint of the conch, are described from the Cenomanian of Hadjoula (Lebanon) by Klug et al. (2021).
 A study on the diversity patterns and spatial structure of belemnite assemblages in Western Tethys Ocean during the Early Jurassic is published by Neige, Weis & Fara (2021).
 A study on morphological changes of belemnites across the Pliensbachian-Toarcian boundary event, based on data from the Peniche GSSP section (Portugal), is published by Nätscher et al. (2021).
 A study on chemistry, organization and genesis of circular structures (superficially resembling chromatophores) preserved in coleoid cephalopod specimens from the Jurassic of Germany and the Cretaceous of Lebanon is published by Klug et al. (2021).
 A well-preserved soft-body imprint of a fossil squid is described from the lower Oligocene of the Krasnodar region (Russia) by Mironenko et al. (2021), who interpret this finding as the first unquestionable representative of Teuthida in the fossil record known to date, and report preservation of fish remains in the stomach contents of this squid, indicative of its piscivorous diet.
 A specimen of Jeletzkyteuthis coriacea holding a specimen of Parabelopeltis flexuosa in its arms, with the apex very close to its jaws, is described from the Toarcian Posidonia Shale (Germany) by Klug et al. (2021), who interpret this finding as a case of frozen predatory behaviour of two different octobrachian species.
 Redescription of the gladius of the holotype specimen of Necroteuthis hungarica is published by Košťák et al. (2021), who reinterpret this species as a member of the family Vampyroteuthidae linking Mesozoic loligosepiids with extant Vampyroteuthis.
 Klompmaker & Landman (2021) describe the oldest drill holes produced by octopodoids in lucinid bivalve specimens from the Campanian of South Dakota, indicating that the drilling habit evolved early in the evolutionary history of Octopodoidea.

Gastropods

Bivalves

New taxa

Research
 A study on the evolution and possible causes of the extinction of alatoconchid bivalves is published by Chen et al. (2021).
 A study on the arcoid bivalve diversity during the Eocene doubthouse interval of global climate cooling is published by Hickman (2021).

Other molluscs

General research
 A study on the relationship between temperature and diversity in the fossil record of marine molluscs over the last 145 million years is published by Boag, Gearty & Stockey (2021).
 A study on the relationship between the species richness of shallow-marine molluscs, the number of ecological functional groups, and oceanic temperature in the fossil record of New Zealand over the last ~40 million years is published by Womack et al. (2021).

References 

2021 in paleontology
Paleomalacology